Born to Race may refer to:

 Born to Race (1988 film), a film directed by James Fargo
 Born to Race (2011 film), a film directed by Alex Ranarivelo
 "Born to Race", a 2017 song by OneRepublic